Patricia Drake is a Canadian actress working on TV and in animated shows, mostly with Ocean Studios in Vancouver, British Columbia, Canada.

Filmography

Anime roles
 Black Lagoon as Balalaika
 Dragon Ball Z as Android 19 (Ocean dub)
 Human Crossing as Kazuya's mother
 Inuyasha as Koyuki, Kannon
 Ranma ½ as Yang Gui-fei
 Maison Ikkoku as Naomi, Yagami's Neighbor, Kyoko's mother 
 Tetsujin 28 as Ayako Umenokoji

Non-anime roles
 Beat Bugs as Martha
 Beast Machines as Strika
 Class of the Titans as Hera, Hecate, Artemis, Female Tourist
 Monster Mash as Stella Tinklemeister
 Broken Saints as Cielle (credited as Patty Drake)
 Stargate SG-1 — Additional voices
 John Tucker Must Die as Coach Williams
 X-Men: Evolution — Additional voices
 Sabrina, the Animated Series
 Barbie as the Island Princess as Queen Danielle, Mama Pig
 Being Ian as Vicky Kelley, Granma Kelly, Blonde Hottie, Redhead Nurse, Blonde Student at Water Fountain, Girl at Ryan Walter's Book Signing, Motel Phone Operator, Puking Penner, Hospital Receptionist, Mrs. Melodious, Magenta, Old Woman Almost Hit by Cinderblocks, Cat Lady, Mom #5, Fan #7, Woman's voice, Teen Girl Driver, Alien, Superfan, Student #3, Girl in Blue Sari, Cafeteria Worker and Little Girl
 Geronimo Stilton as Sally Rasmaussen
 Dead Rising 2 as Bibi Love
 Dead Rising 2: Off the Record as Bibi Love
 Dead Rising 3 as Bibi Love (song)
 Barbie: A Fashion Fairy Tale as Aunt Millicent
 My Little Pony: Friendship Is Magic as Ms. Peachbottom, Twilight Velvet (S07, E22), and Yingrid
 Ultimate Book of Spells
 Kid vs. Kat — Additional voices
 Polly Pocket as Griselle Grande

References

External links
 
 Patricia Drake at the CrystalAcids Anime Voice Actor Database
 

1957 births
Living people
Actresses from Vancouver
Canadian film actresses
Canadian television actresses
Canadian voice actresses
20th-century Canadian actresses
21st-century Canadian actresses